Mount Schmidtman is a peak to the north of Mount Naab at the northeast end of Eastwind Ridge, Convoy Range. Named in association with Eastwind Ridge after Captain R.D. Schmidtman, USCG, commander of the icebreaker USCGC Eastwind in the Ross Seas Ship Group in Operation Deep Freeze, 1960.

Mountains of Victoria Land
Scott Coast